Nicholas Colla (born 14 October 1986 in Melbourne, Australia) is an Australian actor, writer and director, best known for his roles as Joel Peterson in Holly's Heroes and Adam Stevens in Neighbours.

Career
Colla began acting at an early age, appearing in a McDonald’s commercial directed by US pilot director David Nutter and shot by Academy Award-winning cinematographer Wally Pfister. Since then he has appeared in television series such as Neighbours, The Saddle Club, Blue Heelers, City Homicide, Wicked Science 2 and the AFI award-winning Holly’s Heroes.

Colla's performances on stage include Mamillius in the Bell Shakespeare Company's The Winter’s Tale, Shedding directed by Sam Strong at La Mama Theatre, as well as the lead in the debut season of Australian play The Cutting Boys.

His directing credits include the short films Palindromes and Rocketman which have screened at festivals including Palm Springs ShortFest, Cinequest, Flickerfest and St Kilda Film Festival.

He is also a producer on the Australian television series The Wizards of Aus.

Filmography

References

External links

Official website
LateNite Films (Company Website)

1986 births
Australian male child actors
Australian male television actors
Living people